Galla Aruna Kumari (born 1 August 1944) is an Indian politician. She is the daughter of former Indian parliamentarian and social activist Paturi Rajagopala Naidu. She is currently a polit buro member of the Telugu Desam Party. She was the Minister for Geology and Mines in the Government of Andhra Pradesh, India and MLA for the Chandragiri constituency. On 8 March 2014, she joined Telugu Desam Party.

Aruna Kumari is married to Galla Ramachandra Naidu, an industrialist and founder of Amara Raja Group of Companies. She has a B.S. in Computer Science from Lake View College. She worked for the Chrysler Corporation as computer programmer and departmental head for Management Information Systems in the sales division. Her prior roles in her political career include that of President of the Andhra Pradesh Mahila Congress and General Secretary, Pradesh Congress Committee. She was also the MLA for Chandragiri constituency from 1989 to 1994,1999–2014 and Health Education and Insurance Minister  in the first term of  Andhra Pradesh Chief Minister, late Y. S. Rajasekhara Reddy, during which time, she was responsible for creating the universal health programme, Aarogyasri. She also held the ministry for Roads and Buildings during second term of Congress government for some time. Aruna Kumari wrote several novels in Telugu.

References

External links

Indian National Congress politicians from Andhra Pradesh
Telugu politicians
1949 births
Living people
Indian computer programmers
Indian computer scientists
Indian women computer scientists
People from Chittoor district
Andhra Pradesh MLAs 2009–2014
Telugu Desam Party politicians
State cabinet ministers of Andhra Pradesh
Indian women activists
Businesswomen from Andhra Pradesh
20th-century Indian women politicians
20th-century Indian politicians
21st-century Indian women politicians
21st-century Indian politicians
Women scientists from Andhra Pradesh
Women state cabinet ministers of India
20th-century Indian businesswomen
20th-century Indian businesspeople
21st-century Indian businesswomen
21st-century Indian businesspeople
Amara Raja Group
Andhra Pradesh MLAs 1989–1994
Andhra Pradesh MLAs 1999–2004
Andhra Pradesh MLAs 2004–2009
Women members of the Andhra Pradesh Legislative Assembly